Mediator may refer to:
A person who engages in mediation
Business mediator, a mediator in business 
Vanishing mediator, a philosophical concept
Mediator variable, in statistics

Chemistry and biology

Mediator (coactivator), a multiprotein complex that functions as a transcriptional coactivator
Endogenous mediator, proteins that enhance and activate the functions of other proteins
Gaseous mediator, chemicals produced by some cells that have biological signalling functions
Mediator, a brand name of benfluorex, a withdrawn appetite suppressant medication

Internet, software, and computer

Mediator pattern, in computer science
A mail server's role in email forwarding

Other

Mediator, guitar pick or plectrum, an accessory for picking strings of musical instruments
The Mediator, a teen book series by Meg Cabot (some under the pseudonym Jenny Carroll)
The Mediator, a television documentary produced by Open Media
Mediator (Christ as Mediator), an office of Jesus Christ
Linesman/Mediator, a radar system in the United Kingdom
HMS Mediator, three ships of the British navy 
USS Mediator, a ship of the United States navy
Mediator, brand name for benfluorex, an anorectic and hypolipidemic agent